The Burkan-2H (Arabic H-بركان ٢), or Volcano-2H (also spelled as Borkan H2 and Burqan 2H) is a mobile short-range ballistic missile used by the Houthis militants in Yemen. The Volcano H-2 was first launched in July 2017. It is related to the Scud missile family.

Development
The Burkan-2H was first revealed to the international community when it was launched at Saudi Arabia on 22 July 2017. According to Saudi Arabia the missiles are of Iranian origin, with USAF Lt. General Jeffrey L. Harrigian, Commander, Air Force's Central Command in Qatar, agreeing. However Jane's Intelligence Review has assessed that it would be difficult to ship entire ballistic missiles to Yemen, suggesting the Burkan-2 is a Scud modified in Yemen for longer range.

Design
The Burkan-2H is a member of the Scud family. Analysts identify it as being based on the Iranian Qiam 1/Scud-C, Iranian Shahab-2/Scud-C, or Scud-D missile.

The shape of the warhead is a "baby-bottle" design, which can shift the center of gravity and center of pressure to compensate for changes in payload weight from cone-shaped warheads; can increase drag, increasing stability during reentry (at the expense of range), and potentially increase accuracy; and can increase the terminal velocity of the warhead, making it harder to intercept. Similarly shaped warheads are used on Iran's Shahab-3 and Qiam 1 missiles.

Operational history
The first recorded launch of the Burkan-2H was on 22 July 2017. The Houthis released a statement, saying that the missile successfully hit the region of Yanbu in Saudi Arabia and caused a major fire at an Aramco oil refinery. The Saudi government disputed this claim, stating that the fire was instead caused by a malfunctioning generator.

On 4 November 2017, Saudi Arabia claimed to have intercepted a Burkan-2H over its capital, Riyadh, with a MIM-104 Patriot. The missile was reportedly aimed at King Khalid International Airport. A December 2017 report in The New York Times casts doubt on the official Saudi claim that this missile was successfully shot down. The article cites a team of experts who allege that the missile's warhead was not intercepted and actually detonated near the airport. The research team reviewed photo and video evidence, which led them to conclude that the missile-defense system had failed; the MIM-104 interceptor either missed the Volcano H-2 entirely or struck only the rear propulsion segment of the H-2 after it had separated from the warhead.

On 19 December 2017, Houthi rebels launched a Burkan-2H at the capital of Saudi Arabia Riyadh, with their supposed objective being to take out senior officials that were all expected to meet at Saudi Defense Headquarters; however, Saudi Arabia claimed that they were able to intercept the ballistic missile. An independent analysis by IHS Jane's found no evidence that the missiles had been shot down.

According to the US State Department, the missile was actually an Iranian Qiam 1. Saudi Arabia's Ministry of Culture and Information also supplied the Associated Press with pictures from a military briefing of what it claimed were components from the intercepted missile bearing Iranian markings matching those on other pictures of the Qiam 1. Joint Forces Command of the Arab Coalition detailed the evidence. There have also been reports of previous attempts by Iran to send missiles to Yemen.

On 25 March 2018, the Houthis fired a total of seven missiles, with three of them aimed at Riyadh, including at least one Burkan-2H. One Egyptian citizen was killed in the incident, the first casualty in the capital since the start of Saudi involvement in the Yemeni conflict. Saudi sources claimed that he was killed by debris from an intercepted Houthi missile, but this is disputed, with analysis of videos from the scene appearing to show a Saudi Patriot missile malfunctioning and crashing into a residential neighbourhood. The remaining four missiles targeted airports and military installations near Abha, Jizan and Najran in the south of Saudi Arabia.

See also 
Al-Najm al-Thaqib (missile)
Qaher-1
Burkan-1
Qiam 1
Badr-1 (rocket)
Yemeni Civil War (2015–present)
Yemeni Armed Forces
Houthi insurgency in Yemen
Conflict in Najran, Jizan and Asir

References 

Military equipment of Yemen
Short-range ballistic missiles
Short-range ballistic missiles of Yemen
Surface-to-surface missiles
Surface-to-surface missiles of Yemen
Ballistic missiles
Ballistic missiles of Yemen
Guided missiles of Yemen
Theatre ballistic missiles